John Nicholas O'Neill (8 September 1935 – 23 September 2012) was an Irish professional footballer.

He was a defender who started his career with Drumcondra in his native city before moving to Preston North End in April 1958 along with team-mate Alan Kelly. He eventually went on to replace the legendary Joe Walton at left back and played for Preston 50 times. O'Neill won his only cap for the Republic of Ireland national football team on 28 September 1960 against Wales at Dalymount Park.

O'Neill moved to Barrow in July 1963 for a £1,500 fee. 

He died in September 2012, aged 77.

References

Republic of Ireland association footballers
Republic of Ireland international footballers
Preston North End F.C. players
1935 births
English Football League players
2012 deaths
Association footballers from Dublin (city)
Barrow A.F.C. players
Drumcondra F.C. players
Association football utility players